All Assam Minorities Students' Union (AAMSU) is a student organization from the religious and linguistic minorities communities of Assam. It is fighting for minorities people facing prosecution at the hands of government. The union was formed during the Assam movement to safe guard and uphold the Constitutional Rights of minorities in Assam. AAMSU is a mass movement to raise the voice of minorities living in Assam, that's why it is sometime refer as "Voice of The Voiceless".

History 
The union was formed on 31 March 1980. A convention took place at Jaleswar, Goalpara from 29–30 March. Two Assamese leaders of Congress (I), Lolit Doley and Dhrubanaryan Barua, addressed the convention.

Abdul Hai Nagori and Azghar Ali were the first President and Secretary of the union, respectively. Mukshed Ali, advocate drafted its constitution.

References 

Organisations based in Assam
Students' unions in India
1980 establishments in Assam
Organizations established in 1980